Winogradskyella eckloniae is a Gram-negative, aerobic, rod-shaped and motile bacterium from the genus of Winogradskyella which has been isolated from the alga Ecklonia cava from the Jeju Island.

References

Flavobacteria
Bacteria described in 2015